Skewarkey Primitive Baptist Church is a historic Primitive Baptist church located near Williamston, Martin County, North Carolina. It was built in 1858–1859, and is a one-story, front-gable timber-frame building in a simply rendered Greek Revival style. The building measures just over 60 feet deep and 40 feet wide. Located on the property is the contributing church cemetery.

It was added to the National Register of Historic Places in 2005.

References

Baptist churches in North Carolina
Churches on the National Register of Historic Places in North Carolina
Greek Revival church buildings in North Carolina
Churches completed in 1859
19th-century Baptist churches in the United States
Churches in Martin County, North Carolina
National Register of Historic Places in Martin County, North Carolina
Wooden churches in North Carolina
Primitive Baptists